The Heroic Age: A Journal of Early Medieval Northwestern Europe is a peer-reviewed academic journal founded in 1998, with its first issue having been published during spring/summer 1999. The founder and the first editor-in-chief of the journal was Michelle Ziegler.

The title of the journal, The Heroic Age, refers to the early medieval period, though there is certain variation in the definition of the period in focus: it is (or has been, in previous versions of their website, calls for papers, and other sources) defined as stretching "from the early 4th through 13th centuries", "from the beginning of the fourth century through the beginning of the thirteenth", "from the late fourth through eleventh centuries", "from 400-1100 AD", "approximately [...] between 300 and 1200 CE", and "from the late Roman empire to the advent of the Norman empire". This variation is (partly, at least) accounted for in the Letter from the Editor in Issue 10 (May 2007) as related to changes in the editorial board of the journal: "[...] our Editorial Board experienced a few changes. While some members retired, we also added several new members [...] With these changes in board composition, our attentions necessarily shifted: four of the five new members do significant work on the continent. To address this, our new Mission Statement increases the time period we consider from 400–1100 to 300–1200. Likewise, there is an accompanying shift in geography. Our new Mission Statement addresses all of Northwestern Europe evenly rather than stressing the British Isles."

Publications in The Heroic Age cover all aspects of Early Medieval Northwestern Europe. The journal seeks, according to their own homepage, "to foster dialogue between all scholars of this period across ethnic and disciplinary boundaries, including—but not limited to—history, archaeology, and literature pertaining to the period".

The Heroic Age started as a biannual journal: it had a spring/summer and a fall/winter issue in 1999 and in 2000. Two issues were published also in 2010, the first one in August and the second in November. However, the frequency of published issues decreased in the new millennium. No issues of the journal were published in 2002, 2011, 2013, and 2014. Otherwise (that is, in 2001, 2003–2009, 2012, and 2015), one issue per year was published. Larry Swain wrote that the original idea was that The Heroic Age should appear quarterly. Intentions to publish two yearly issues have also been expressed, both in the initial stage, and later.

Regular features include full-length research articles, editions and translations of primary sources, biographical essays, a forum on modern theory and scholarship, a review of relevant web-sites ("Electronic Medievalia"), reviews of scholarship originally published in German, Dutch, and French (a column called "Continental Business"), as well as book reviews (including reviews of scholarly monographs and fiction based on the Middle Ages), and film and television reviews.

In 2010, the journal published a cluster of essays in tandem with postmedieval: a journal of cultural medieval studies.

The website of the journal has also a links page.

The editors-in-chief are currently L. J. Swain (Bemidji State University) and Deanna Forsman (North Hennepin Community College).

The journal is included databases and bibliographies including the MLA Directory of Periodicals and International Bibliography, EBSCO's Electronic Journal Service, the History of Science Society, and others.

References

External links
 

European history journals
Publications established in 1999
Medieval studies literature
English-language journals
Irregular journals